Elvir Gigolaj (born 30 June 1992) is a Bosnian footballer.

Early life

Gigolaj was born in Croatia to a Kosovar Albanian father and Bosniak mother from Brčko, Bosnia and Herzegovina. He was raised in London, Ontario, where his father owns a bakery that carries the family name.

Club career

Early career
He, at one point, played for London City's soccer side who participated in the Canadian Soccer League and with whom he had a good relationship with his coach, Luka Shaqiri.

Gigolaj attended St. Mary's University for two years from 2010 to 2012, playing for the Huskies in the 2010 and 2011 varsity seasons, scoring 11 goals in 26 appearances.

FC Edmonton
In January 2012, after training with the team, Gigolaj officially joined FC Edmonton of the North American Soccer League. Gigolaj then made his debut for FC Edmonton in the NASL on 3 June 2012 in which he came on as an 85th-minute substitute for Yashir Pinto as FC Edmonton went on to lose the match 2–1.

He then scored his first professional goal of his career on 23 September 2012 against the Fort Lauderdale Strikers in which he found the net in the 90th minute to start a late comeback for Edmonton as they went from 2–0 down to finishing the match drawing 2–2.

On 30 June 2013, it was announced that Gigolaj was released by FC Edmonton.

Germany
After being released by FC Edmonton, Gigolaj attempted to join the reserve team of German Bundesliga side, Hertha BSC but he had hit paperwork problems.

FC London
Gigolaj spent the 2016 and 2017 seasons with League1 Ontario club FC London. In 2021, he returned to the Canadian Soccer League to play with St. Catharines Hrvat.

Honours
FC London
League1 Ontario First Team All Star: 2016
League1 Ontario Third Team All Star: 2017

Career statistics

References

1992 births
Living people
Association football forwards
Canadian soccer players
Canadian people of Albanian descent
Canadian people of Bosnia and Herzegovina descent
Canadian people of Kosovan descent
Soccer players from London, Ontario
Croatian emigrants to Canada
Naturalized citizens of Canada
Croatian people of Albanian descent
Croatian people of Kosovan descent
Croatian people of Bosniak descent
London City players
FC Edmonton players
Canadian Soccer League (1998–present) players
North American Soccer League players
League1 Ontario players
FC London players